The 2003–04 NBA season was the Clippers' 34th season in the National Basketball Association, and their 20th season in Los Angeles. During the offseason, the Clippers signed free agents Bobby Simmons and former All-Star forward Glen Rice. However, after 18 games, Rice was released. With the Clippers starting from scratch again as they celebrated their 20th season in L.A., they hired Mike Dunleavy, Sr. as their new head coach. Under Dunleavy, the Clippers played slightly around .500 with a 22–25 start as of February 6. However, after co-hosting the 2004 NBA All-Star Game at the Staples Center with the Lakers, the young Clippers struggled badly as they won just six games, and posted a 13-game losing streak near the end of the season. The Clippers would slowly sink down the standings, coming to rest once again at the bottom of the Pacific Division with a 28–54 record. Following the season, Quentin Richardson signed as a free agent with the Phoenix Suns.

Draft picks

Roster

Roster Notes
 Forward Glen Rice becomes the 10th former Laker to play with the crosstown rival Clippers.  He was waived after playing in 18 games and for refusing to be placed the injury reserve list.
 Center Olden Polynice's second tour of duty with the franchise.  He previously played for the team from 1990-1992.  He was the 12th man off the bench and only played 2 games before being waived.
 Guard Doug Overton's second tour of duty with the franchise as well.  He previously played for the team in 2001-2002.
 Guard Randy Livingston was signed to a 10-day contract and played in 4 games before contract expired.

Regular season

Season standings

Record vs. opponents

Game log

Player statistics

Player Statistics Citation:

Awards and records

Transactions
The Clippers have been involved in the following transactions during the 2003-04 season.

Trades

Free Agents

Re-signed

Additions

Subtractions

See also
 2003-04 NBA season

References

Los Angeles Clippers seasons